Tungsten dichloride dioxide, or Tungstyl chloride is the chemical compound with the formula WO2Cl2. It is a yellow-colored solid.  It is used as a precursor to other tungsten compounds.  Like other tungsten halides, WO2Cl2 is sensitive to moisture, undergoing hydrolysis.

Preparation
WO2Cl2 is prepared by ligand redistribution reaction from tungsten trioxide and tungsten hexachloride:
 2 WO3  + WCl6  →  3 WO2Cl2
Using a two-zone tube furnace, a vacuum-sealed tube containing these solids is heated to 350 °C.  The yellow product sublimes to the cooler end of the reaction tube.  No redox occurs in this process.  An alternative route highlights the oxophilicity of tungsten:
WCl6  +  2 O(Si(CH3)3)2  →  3 WO2Cl2  +  4 ClSi(CH3)3

This reaction, like the preceding one, proceeds via the intermediacy of WOCl4.

Structure
The compound is a polymer consisting of distorted octahedral W centres.  The monomer is characterized by two short W-O distances, typical for a multiple W-O bond, and two long W-O distances more typical of a single or dative W-O bond.

Related oxy halides
Tungsten forms a number of oxyhalides including WOCl4, WOCl3, WOCl2.  The corresponding bromides (WOBr4, WOBr3, WOBr2) are also known as is WO2I2.

Reactions

WO2Cl2 is a Lewis acid, forming soluble adducts of the type WO2Cl2L2, where L is a donor ligand such as bipyridine and dimethoxyethane.  Such complexes often cannot be prepared by depolymerization of the inorganic solid, but are generated in situ from WOCl4.

References

Tungsten compounds
Oxychlorides